Bannerwood Park is a baseball park in the northwest United States, located  in Bellevue, Washington, a suburb east of Seattle. It is the home field of Seattle University, a member of the NCAA Division I Western Athletic Conference.  The venue features lighting, bleacher seating, concessions, and restrooms.

On February 23, 2010, Bannerwood Park hosted Seattle's first home game since returning to Division I; the Redhawks lost 21–7 to Division II Saint Martin's of Lacey.

Usage
In addition to Seattle U. home games, Bannerwood Park also hosts numerous high school baseball games, including the KingCo Conference 3A tournament.

Seating
There are three sets of bleachers at the park. Behind home plate is the largest, seating 200 people. On the sides to that by the dugouts are smaller bleachers that seat 50 people each.

The official capacity of Bannerwood Park is 300, but there is abundant room to stand and watch or sit in your own folding chair down the foul lines into the outfield.

See also 
 List of NCAA Division I baseball venues

References

External links
City of Bellevue: Bannerwood Park
Seattle University Athletics: Facilities

College baseball venues in the United States
Baseball venues in Washington (state)
Seattle Redhawks baseball